Waring Brothers was an English company specialising in railway structures.

History
The company was founded by Charles Waring, William Waring and Henry Waring in 1841 in York as a civil engineering business.

By 1853 the company was working for the Central Peninsular Railway Company in Portugal.

It went on to complete numerous railway structures including three viaducts in Luxembourg (including the Passerelle) and the station (but not the roof, which was tendered separately) of St Pancras in London.

Major projects
Major projects included: 
 The Dorset Central Railway, completed in 1858. Incorrect: Messrs Waring completed the line from Wimborne to Blandford St Mary's temporary station in October, 1860; they then laid the section from Blandford St Mary (including new town station) to Templecombe for the newly formed Somerset & Dorset Railway (formed 1862), completing it in August, 1863.
 The Ceylon Railway (ow known as Sri Lanka Railways), completed in 1859 (its wrong). Colombo to Ambepussa 35 miles of  Ceylon Railway was completed by Faviell and the 1st train ran on 27 December 1864.
 The Pernambuco, Recife and San Francisco Railway, completed in 1860
 The Sicily Railway, completed in 1862
 The East Indian Railway, completed in 1862
 The Bristol Port Railway, completed in 1863
 The Honduras Railway, completed in 1870
 The Central Uruguay Railway, completed in 1871
 The Central do Brasil, Rio de Janeiro, 1884
 The Minas an Rio Railway,[Cruzeiro, São Paulo, Brasil], 1884

Demise of the company
Charles Waring went into politics as Member of Parliament for Poole in 1865 after which time there were very few contracts entered into so it appears that the company was wound up in the early 1870s.

References

Construction and civil engineering companies of England
British companies established in 1841
Companies based in York
1841 establishments in England
Defunct companies based in London
Construction and civil engineering companies established in 1841